A Town South of Bakersfield was a series of three compilation CDs showcasing New Country musicians in the late 1980s and early 1990s.

The first album came out in 1986 and featured acts such as Dwight Yoakam, the Lonesome Strangers, and Candye Kane. The second album came out in 1988 and the third in 1992}.

Track listings

References

Country music compilation albums